Alex de Minaur was the reigning champion from when the tournament was last held in 2019, but chose not to participate this year.

John Isner won his sixth Atlanta Open title, defeating Brandon Nakashima in the final, 7–6(10–8), 7–5.

Seeds
The top four seeds receive a bye into the second round.

Draw

Finals

Top half

Bottom half

Qualifying

Seeds

Qualifiers

Qualifying draw

First qualifier

Second qualifier

Third qualifier

Fourth qualifier

References

External links
 Main draw
 Qualifying draw

2021 ATP Tour
2021 Singles
2021 US Open Series